John Negrin (born March 26, 1989) is a Canadian professional ice hockey player. Negrin was a third round pick of the Calgary Flames, 70th overall, at the 2007 NHL Entry Draft; he played only three games with them and has spent the majority of his career playing in the American Hockey League.

Playing career
As a youth, Negrin played in the 2002 Quebec International Pee-Wee Hockey Tournament with a minor ice hockey team from North Vancouver.

A graduate of the Western Hockey League (WHL), Negrin played the 2008–09 WHL season with the Kootenay Ice and Swift Current Broncos. Upon the conclusion of his junior season, Negrin was assigned to the Quad City Flames, though he was recalled by Calgary on an emergency basis on April 3, 2009 before he could play an AHL game. He made his NHL debut that night against the Minnesota Wild and finished the season with Calgary. Negrin's 2009–10 season, his first professional season in Abbotsford, was reduced to just 45 games by a broken wrist. On January 30, 2012 Negrin was traded from the Calgary Flames to the Winnipeg Jets in exchange for forward Akim Aliu. He was then assigned to the Jets' AHL team, the St. John's IceCaps.

Negrin signed with the AHL's Chicago Wolves on August 20, 2012. On October 10, 2012 Negrin was assigned to the Kalamazoo Wings of the ECHL to begin the 2012–13 season. where he played in 32 games before he was recalled to Chicago on 14 January 2013. After one appearance with the Wolves, Negrin was reassigned to Kalamazoo. On February 27, 2013, Negrin received his second recall by the Wolves to be immediately loaned to fellow AHL club, the Lake Erie Monsters. For the remainder of the season, Negrin was a fixture in the Monsters blueline scoring 2 goals in 17 games.

On July 19, 2013, Negrin signed as a free agent to a one-year contract AHL contract with the Utica Comets, an affiliate of the Vancouver Canucks.

As a free agent from the Comets following four seasons with the club, Negrin went un-signed into the 2017–18 season. On October 21, 2017, Negrin belatedly signed with Norwegian club, Lørenskog IK of GET-ligaen.

In August 2019, Negrin signed with British Elite League (EIHL) club Manchester Storm.

Career statistics

Regular season and playoffs

International

Awards and honours

References

External links
 
 
 

1989 births
Living people
Abbotsford Heat players
Calgary Flames draft picks
Calgary Flames players
Canadian ice hockey defencemen
Canadian expatriate ice hockey players in Norway
Chicago Wolves players
Ice hockey people from British Columbia
Kalamazoo Wings (ECHL) players
Kootenay Ice players
Lake Erie Monsters players
Lørenskog IK players
Manchester Storm (2015–) players
People from West Vancouver
St. John's IceCaps players
Swift Current Broncos players
Utah Grizzlies (ECHL) players
Utica Comets players